The Staunch Book Prize is an award given to thriller novels that avoid featuring violence to women. British writer and screenwriter Bridget Lawless founded the prize in 2018. Some writers object to the premise of the award, referring to it as a "gag order" and accusing it of censorship.

Background 

Lawless established the prize in 2018 after she noticed the number of films that used rape as a plot device in the 2017 British Academy of Film and Television Arts (BAFTA) award nominees, and was inspired by the Time's Up and Me Too movements, to encourage alternatives to violence-against-women tropes.

The official website describes the criteria as "a novel in the thriller genre in which no woman is beaten, stalked, sexually exploited, raped or murdered." The Staunch Book Prize is open to traditionally published, self-published and not-yet-published works and awards  (funded by Lawless).

The annual winner is announced on November 25, which is the International Day for the Elimination of Violence against Women. The original novel prize was suspended for 2021 and was projected to return in 2022. In 2022, the Staunch Book Prize closed.

Controversy 
Several writers criticized the Staunch Book Prize. Crime writer Sarah Hilary equated the prize criteria with silencing the voices of domestic violence victims, and called it "not a prize so much as a gagging order". Domestic noir writer Julia Crouch said "what that kind of prize immediately knocks out is the lived experience of millions of women in this country".

In World Literature Today, writer Janet Clark counters the criticism by saying "the prize is one way of drawing attention toward an undeniable trend of using horrific and perverse brutality as cheap plot devices. And it works: people talk about it." Hallie Rubenhold, writing in The Guardian, calls the prize "noble in sentiment", while acknowledging Val McDermid's argument that "acts of misogyny and violence against women are being committed, they need to be written about, and not swept under the carpet."

The first winner of the prize, Jock Serong, says the prize addresses "that laziness that creeps in, the tropes where women and girls are used unthinkingly as default victims in the story." 
Slate notes that the debate over the prize accomplishes the prize's purpose of drawing attention to the use of violence against women in fiction.

Winners 

 2018: Jock Serong for On the Java Ridge
 2019: Samantha Harvey for The Western Wind
 2020: Attica Locke for Heaven, My Home

References 

Awards established in 2018